Christie  Lynne Hayes is an Australian actress and singer, known for her work on the television series Home and Away as Kirsty Phillips (née Sutherland) who she played from June 2000 to February 2005, and again from May 2008 to October 2009. Since January 2017, Hayes has hosted the breakfast show on I98FM. Hayes is the sister of actress Katherine Hayes.

Personal life
Hayes is the second of four girls in her family. Growing up in North Nowra, as a child she took up gymnastics for a short time before giving it up in order to pursue acting. She played the flute, and learned to read music at age 8. 
She is of Irish and Aboriginal heritage.

At 21, Christie married actor/director Greg Hatton in 2008 in the Southern Highlands. OK! purchased the rights to their wedding story for $30,000, the highest amount paid to a celebrity couple at that time. Guests at the wedding included Home and Away cast members and actor Joel Edgerton. After five years of marriage the couple divorced in May 2013.

Hayes met wine broker Daniel White a few months later. Hayes gave birth to their first child, a son, in October 2014. On 24 April 2015, Hayes announced on The Morning Show that she was pregnant again. Hayes gave birth to a second son in September 2015. Hayes and White married on 27 August 2016 in Lilydale. In April 2019, Hayes announced she and White had separated. 

Hayes announced her engagement to radio announcer Justin Coombes-Pearce in January 2020. The couple decided to elope and were married on 12 May 2021.

Career

Christie Hayes began acting when she was 8 years old after first being approached to become a model. She preferred acting to modelling and spent her childhood in theatre, performing in over 20 plays at her local drama club. She attended the McDonald College for Performing Arts in Strathfield and majored in Drama.

In 2000, Hayes was cast as Maria in the family adventure series Search for Treasure Island, a Grundy Production filmed in Spain and on shown Channel 7.

Later that year Hayes was cast as Kirsty Sutherland in the successful soap opera, Home and Away on Channel 7, after turning down the role of Dani Sutherland (her character's older sister), because she was uncomfortable playing someone three years older than herself, Kirsty being 13 and Dani 16.

She was the first person to be cast in her on screen "Sutherland" family. She played both Kirsty Phillips (née Sutherland) and Laura DeGroot (the two characters were twin sisters separated at birth). Hayes, who was on the cover of TV Week more times in 2004 than any of her other castmates, left Home and Away in October 2004 in order to travel. Her final H&A appearance aired in February 2005.

After leaving the show she appeared as the face of the Pepsi Light campaign in Summer 2006 and made a guest appearance on the soap Blue Water High. She was also involved in the making of various films and television shows, including Room 101, Searching For Eva, The First Goodbye and Noir.

Hayes played the lead in I.D the film as Kate in 2011.

Hayes returned to Home and Away in May 2008, in a recurring role until October 2009. She is also a model and has been the face of Miki House, Pepsi and Jeans for Genes.

In January 2017, Hayes commenced working on breakfast radio at I98FM in Wollongong. She joined the cast of soap opera Neighbours in 2019 in a guest role.

Charity work
In 2003, at age 16, Youth Week elected her as youth ambassador of Australia for encouraging youth across Australia to realise their creativity. Hayes also appeared at the annual Teddy bears picnic for sick children.

Filmography

References

External links

Australian child actresses
Australian radio personalities
Australian women radio presenters
Australian soap opera actresses
Australian people of Irish descent
Living people
1986 births